Parametopides is a genus of longhorn beetles of the subfamily Lamiinae, containing the following species:

 Parametopides griseolateralis Breuning, 1938
 Parametopides niveoscutellatus Breuning, 1936

References

Lamiini